Philip Klein (April 24, 1889 – June 8, 1935) was an American screenwriter. He worked on around forty films during his career in both the silent and sound eras. He was the son of the British playwright Charles Klein.

Selected filmography
 The Social Highwayman (1926)
 Is Zat So? (1927)
 Don't Marry (1928)
 Charlie Chan Carries On (1931)
 The Spider (1931)
 There Were Thirteen (1931)
 Riders of the Purple Sage (1931)

References

Bibliography
 Aubrey Solomon. The Fox Film Corporation, 1915-1935: A History and Filmography. McFarland, 2011.

External links

1889 births
1935 deaths
American people of English-Jewish descent
20th-century American screenwriters